Tomás Agramonte de la Rosa (born January 28, 1978 in La Victoria, Dominican Republic) is a former baseball infielder. He last played for the Chunichi Dragons of Japan's Central League. He previously played for the Montreal Expos and San Francisco Giants of Major League Baseball.

External links

1978 births
Living people
Altoona Curve players
Chunichi Dragons players
Colorado Springs Sky Sox players
Dominican Republic expatriate baseball players in Canada
Dominican Republic expatriate baseball players in Japan
Dominican Republic expatriate baseball players in the United States
Fresno Grizzlies players
Jupiter Hammerheads players

Major League Baseball players from the Dominican Republic
Major League Baseball shortstops
Montreal Expos players
Nashville Sounds players
Nashua Pride players
Nippon Professional Baseball infielders
Ottawa Lynx players
San Francisco Giants players
Vermont Expos players